Guglielmo Tuttavilla (died 1569) was a Roman Catholic prelate who served as Bishop of Sarno (1548–1569).

Biography
On 27 April 1548, Guglielmo Tuttavilla was appointed during the papacy of Pope Paul III as Bishop of Sarno. He served as Bishop of Sarno until his death in 1569.

References

External links and additional sources
 (for Chronology of Bishops) 
 (for Chronology of Bishops) 

16th-century Italian Roman Catholic bishops
Bishops appointed by Pope Paul III
1569 deaths